Dongvani is a Georgian family name from the Svaneti region in north-western Georgia.

Dongvani family name comes from these towns of Svaneti: Lentekhi, Mazashi, Sasashi, Shkedi and Chikhareshi.

References

Georgian-language surnames